Baking chocolate, or cooking chocolate, is chocolate intended to be used for baking and in sweet foods that may or may not be sweetened. Dark chocolate, milk chocolate, and white chocolate, are produced and marketed as baking chocolate. However, lower quality baking chocolate may not be as flavorful compared to higher-quality chocolate, and may have a different mouthfeel.

Production
Modern manufactured baking chocolate is typically formed from chocolate liquor formed into bars or chocolate chips. Baking chocolate may be of a lower quality compared to other types of chocolate, and may have part of the cocoa butter replaced with other fats that do not require tempering. This type of baking chocolate may be easier to handle compared to those that have not had their cocoa butter content lowered.

Varieties
It is typically prepared in unsweetened, bittersweet, semisweet and sweet varieties, depending on the amount of added sugar. 

Recipes that include unsweetened baking chocolate typically use a significant amount of sugar. Bittersweet baking chocolate must contain 35 percent chocolate liquor or higher. Most baking chocolates have at least a 50% cocoa content, with the remaining content usually being mostly sugar. 

Sweet varieties may be referred to as "sweet baking chocolate" or "sweet chocolate". Sweet baking chocolate contains more sugar than bittersweet and semisweet varieties, and semisweet varieties contain more sugar than bittersweet varieties. Sweet and semisweet baking chocolate is prepared with a chocolate liquor content between 15 and 35 percent.

The table below denotes the four primary varieties of baking chocolate.

Manufacturers
Manufacturers of baking chocolate include Baker's Chocolate, Callebaut, Ghirardelli, Guittard, The Hershey Company, Lindt, Menier, and Valrhona.

See also

 Types of chocolate

References

Bibliography

  136 pages.

Types of chocolate
Baking